Pseudorhizobium pelagicum is a species of Gram-negative marine bacteria isolated from Mediterranean sea.

References

Rhizobiaceae